Vanessa Raw (born 28 September 1984 in Hexham) is a former professional triathlete, member of the British Olympic Triathlon Squad. She is now an artist and lives and works in Ramsgate/Margate. 

Over the 10 years 2006 to 2014, Vanessa Raw took part in 26 ITU competitions and achieved 8 top ten positions, among which 3 medals. She then achieved four medals in long distance ( ironman) events before retiring.

After the first and successful triathlon year in 2006 Raw suffered a setbacks of numerous injuries and illness, year after year. She eventually managed to reconcile high performance triathlon, whilst painting and undertaking a degree course in Fine Art, which she finished at Loughborough University in 2009, the year in which she also won two silver medals at (Premium) European Cups.

She now works full time as an artist in Ramsgate. In 2021/22 she has shown her work in London and Margate.

ITU Competitions 
The following list is based upon the official ITU rankings and the athlete's ITU Profile Page.
Unless indicated otherwise, all competitions enumerated below are triathlons and belong to the Elite category.

BG = the sponsor British Gas · DNF = did not finish · DNS = did not start

Notes

English female triathletes
Living people
1984 births
Alumni of Loughborough University
Sportspeople from Hexham